Chersodromia is a genus of hybotid dance flies in the family Hybotidae. There are more than 70 described species in Chersodromia.

Species
These 73 species belong to the genus Chersodromia:

Chersodromia adriatica Chvála, 1970
Chersodromia alata (Walker, 1835)
Chersodromia albipennis (Perris, 1852)
Chersodromia albopilosa Chvála, 1970
Chersodromia amaura (Becker, 1902)
Chersodromia ancilottoi Raffone, Rampini & Scarpa, 1988
Chersodromia anisopyga Plant, 1995
Chersodromia arenaria (Haliday, 1833)
Chersodromia argentina Quate, 1960
Chersodromia beckeri Melander, 1928
Chersodromia bulohensis Grootaert & Shamshev, 2012
Chersodromia bureschi Beschovski, 1973
Chersodromia cana Melander, 1945
Chersodromia caucasica Chvála, 1970
Chersodromia colliniana Frey, 1936
Chersodromia cursitans (Zetterstedt, 1819)
Chersodromia curtipennis Collin, 1950
Chersodromia dissita Collin, 1960
Chersodromia flavicaput Grootaert, Cumming & Shamshev, 2007
Chersodromia flavipes Chvála, 1977
Chersodromia flavipyga Grootaert, 1992
Chersodromia fluviatilis Chvála, 1995
Chersodromia foddaiae Raffone, 1994
Chersodromia gamoviensis Maeda, 2011
Chersodromia glandula Grootaert & Shamshev, 2012
Chersodromia gratiosa Becker, 1908
Chersodromia hackmani Chvála, 1977
Chersodromia hawaiiensis Melander, 1938
Chersodromia hirta (Walker, 1835)
Chersodromia houghii (Melander, 1902)
Chersodromia icana Walker, 1851
Chersodromia incana Walker, 1851
Chersodromia inchoata (Melander, 1906)
Chersodromia insignita Melander, 1945
Chersodromia inusitata (Melander, 1902)
Chersodromia isabellae Grootaert & Shamshev, 2010
Chersodromia italica Chvála, 1970
Chersodromia kamtchatkiana Chvála, 1970
Chersodromia leleji Maeda, 2011
Chersodromia longicornis Curran, 1931
Chersodromia madelinae Arnaud, 1975
Chersodromia magacetes Melander, 1945
Chersodromia malaysiana Grootaert & Shamshev, 2012
Chersodromia mediterranea Chvála, 1970
Chersodromia micra Grootaert, 1992
Chersodromia milanchvalai Beschovski, 1973
Chersodromia mohican Maeda, 2011
Chersodromia nana (Coquillett, 1903)
Chersodromia neocurtipennis Beschovski, 1974
Chersodromia nigripennis Shamshev & Grootaert, 2005
Chersodromia nigripyga Grootaert, 1992
Chersodromia nigrosetosa Chvála, 1970
Chersodromia nubifera (Coquillett, 1899)
Chersodromia obscura Grootaert, Cumming & Shamshev, 2007
Chersodromia oraria Collin, 1966
Chersodromia orlandinii Raffone, 1984
Chersodromia parallela (Melander, 1927)
Chersodromia pasir Grootaert & Shamshev, 2012
Chersodromia pontica Chvála, 1970
Chersodromia pseudoadriatica Raffone, 2004
Chersodromia pseudohirta Chvála, 1970
Chersodromia ratti Raffone, 1987
Chersodromia singaporensis Shamshev & Grootaert, 2005
Chersodromia speculifera Walker, 1851
Chersodromia squamata Grootaert, Shamshev & Andrade, 2010
Chersodromia stenopsis Maeda, 2011
Chersodromia suda Plant, 1995
Chersodromia sylvicola Grootaert & Shamshev, 2012
Chersodromia tiomanensis Grootaert & Shamshev, 2012
Chersodromia tschirnhausi Stark, 1995
Chersodromia yamanei Maeda, 2011
Chersodromia zelandica Rogers, 1982

 † Chersodromia dominicana Solórzano Kraemer & al., 2005

References

Hybotidae
Articles created by Qbugbot
Brachycera genera
Taxa named by Alexander Henry Haliday